The 1984–85 Liga Leumit season saw Maccabi Haifa win the title. Beitar Tel Aviv, Hapoel Lod and Hakoah Ramat Gan were all relegated to Liga Artzit. David Lavi of Maccabi Netanya was the league's top scorer with 18 goals.

Final table

Results

References
Israel - List of Final Tables RSSSF

Liga Leumit seasons
Israel
1